The men's 4x400 metres relay event at the 2010 World Junior Championships in Athletics was held in Moncton, New Brunswick, Canada, at Moncton Stadium on 24 and 25 July.

Medalists

Results

Final
25 July

Heats
24 July

Heat 1

Heat 2

Heat 3

Participant's
According to an unofficial count, 81 athletes from 19 countries participated in the event.

References

4 x 400 metres relay
Relays at the World Athletics U20 Championships